Peter M. Correale (born April 20, 1970 in Oakdale, New York) is an American actor, stand up comedian, and writer. He currently co-hosts The Pete and Sebastian Show podcast with fellow comedian Sebastian Maniscalco that airs weekly on iHeartRadio. In addition, he was a writer and occasional performer on the CBS sitcom Kevin Can Wait.

Early life and education 
Pete Correale was born and raised on Long Island, New York. He graduated from SUNY Fredonia in 1992 with a degree in communication, and also played on the school basketball team. During this time, he took a drama class that inspired him to pursue a career in show business.

Career 
After graduating, Correale moved to New York City to perform improvisation comedy and did part-time acting. He debuted as a stand up comic at the age of 24. He exchanged stage time for cooking burgers and mopping floors at many of the clubs he worked in. He released his first comedy CD, Give It a Rest, in 2013. In addition, he served as a co-host of the former Bruer Unleashed Show on SiriusXM.

As a comedian, Correale has worked with Dave Chappelle, Jay Mohr, Jeffrey Ross, and most recently toured with Brian Regan.

Specials 
The Things We Do for Love (2009)
Give it a Rest (2013)
Let Me Tell Ya (2015)
For Pete’s Sake (2020)

Personal life 
Correale lives in Fredonia, New York with his wife, Jackie, and their daughter, Sadie.

References

External links 

American male comedians
American male television actors
American podcasters
American television writers
Comedians from New York City
Living people
Male actors from New York City
American male television writers
20th-century American comedians
21st-century American comedians
1970 births
Screenwriters from New York (state)